Guangfuhui, or the Restoration Society, was an anti-Qing organization established by Cai Yuanpei in 1904. Many members were from Zhejiang. Notable members included Qiu Jin, Qu Yingguang, Tao Chengzhang, Woo Tsin-hang, Xu Xilin, Zhang Binglin, and Liu Shipei. The organization was merged into Tongmenghui one year later.

"Guangfuhui" was also the name of an organization established by the Republic of China after the 1945-1950 revolution on the mainland with the purpose of "restoring the light on Mainland China". The organization was dissolved in June 1990.

Further reading
Lee, Ta-Ling (1970). Foundations of the Chinese Revolution, 1905-1922: An Historical record of the T'ung-Meng Hui. St. John's University Press.

1904 establishments in China
1911 Revolution